Darius Miceika (born 22 February 1983) is a Lithuanian former professional footballer. He has played for Lithuanian national team.

Club career
Miceika started his career at Polonija Vilnius in 2000. He then moved to FK Žalgiris Vilnius in 2001 before moving to Russian Premier League club FC Zenit Saint Petersburg in 2002, with whom he won the Russian Premier League Cup in 2003. He moved to Latvia in 2005 with Virslīga club, Liepājas Metalurgs. In his first season at the club, 2005, he scored in the 2–1 Latvian Cup final defeat to FK Ventspils on 25 September. In the 2006 Virslīga season he was third top scorer in the league with 13 goals and second top Liepājas Metalurgs scorer. He scored a hat-trick on 26 April in a 6–1 win over Dižvanagi Rēzekne. In December 2006 he was named joint best midfielder with Skonto player, Vitālijs Astafjevs for the 2006 season in Latvia by the Latvian Football Federation. He spent the first half of 2009 playing for Granit Mikashevichi in the Belarusian Premier League. During the summer transfer window of 2009 he was transferred to FC Metalurh Zaporizhya.

In August 2010 he joined the Latvian champions FK Liepājas Metalurgs once again, that season playing 10 matches and scoring no goals in the LMT Virsliga. After the 2010 season he was released from the club.

International career
Miceika made his debut for Lithuania on 6 September 2006, against Scotland. Brought on as a substitute after 81 minutes, four minutes later he scored a goal, which ended up being his only goal for national team. Despite his goal, Lithuania lost the match 2–1.

Honours
FC Zenit Saint Petersburg
 Russian Premier League runner-up (1): 2003
 Russian Premier League Cup winner (1): 2003
FK Liepājas Metalurgs
 Virslīga winner (1): 2005
 Virslīga runner-up (3): 2006, 2007, 2008
 Latvian Cup winner (1): 2006
 Baltic League winner (1): 2007

References

External links

Profile at national-football-teams.com

1983 births
Living people
Lithuanian people of Polish descent
Lithuanian footballers
Association football midfielders
Lithuania international footballers
Lithuanian expatriate footballers
Expatriate footballers in Belarus
Expatriate footballers in Estonia
Expatriate footballers in Latvia
Expatriate footballers in Russia
Expatriate footballers in Ukraine
Lithuanian expatriate sportspeople in Belarus
Lithuanian expatriate sportspeople in Estonia
Lithuanian expatriate sportspeople in Latvia
Lithuanian expatriate sportspeople in Russia
Lithuanian expatriate sportspeople in Ukraine
Russian Premier League players
Ukrainian Premier League players
FK Žalgiris players
FC Zenit Saint Petersburg players
FK Liepājas Metalurgs players
FC Granit Mikashevichi players
FC Metalurh Zaporizhzhia players
FC Khimki players
FC SKA-Khabarovsk players
FK Riteriai players
JK Sillamäe Kalev players
Meistriliiga players